La Pomarède is a commune in the Aude department in southern France. La Pomarède is centred on a partially preserved Cathar chateau (castle) which is now the property of the commune.  The chateau contains the Maire (town hall), a post office and small library, a primary school, and a privately owned hotel and restaurant. There is also a parish church (Roman Catholic) and cemetery in the commune. Self-catering accommodation is available in gites a few minutes' walk from the chateau.

The major nearby towns are Castelnaudary (a garrison town, also in the Department of Aude) and Revel (in the neighbouring Department of Haute Garonne), both about twenty minutes' drive away.

Population

See also
Communes of the Aude department

References

Communes of Aude
Aude communes articles needing translation from French Wikipedia